American Multiple Industries was a company that produced a line of pornographic video games for the Atari 2600 called Mystique Presents Swedish Erotica, which included the games Beat 'Em & Eat 'Em, Bachelor Party and Custer's Revenge. It was one of several video game companies that tried to use sex to sell its games. The brand name Swedish Erotica was licensed from a series of pornographic films by Caballero Control Corporation, although they were programmed in the United States, and manufactured in Hong Kong.

"I just don't believe adults want to shoot down rocket ships", AMI's president Stuart Kesten said. According to industry watchers and critics, AMI's game designs were generally simple, with crude graphics and unexceptional gameplay.

AMI's game Custer's Revenge gained particular notoriety for its plot. In the game, the player controls the character of "Custer," a naked man sporting a cowboy hat and a visible erection, obviously inspired by George Armstrong Custer. Custer has to overcome various obstacles in order to rape a crudely depicted, large-breasted Native American woman who is tied to a cactus. The game prompted complaints from a number of groups—women's rights, anti-pornography, Native American, and video game critics all made complaints.

AMI exited the video game industry just before the video game crash of 1983. AMI's share of the rights to the games were sold to the PlayAround spin-off company, which continued the pornographic game line.

See also
 List of video games notable for negative reception
 Video game controversies
 Sexism in video gaming
 Gender representation in video games

References

Defunct video game companies of the United States
Atari 2600
Pornography
Obscenity controversies in video games